Dorymyrmex steigeri is a species of ant in the genus Dorymyrmex. Described by Santschi in 1912, the species is endemic to Argentina and Uruguay.

References

Dorymyrmex
Hymenoptera of South America
Insects described in 1912